Moore House is a historic home located at Smyrna, Kent County, Delaware.  It built between in 1868, and is a two-story, frame dwelling with Italianate and Gothic Revival style decorative detail. It has an unusual, off-set double-pile, "house-on-house" plan. It has a cross-gable roof with a distinctive cornice and a wraparound porch.

It was listed on the National Register of Historic Places in 1982.

References

Houses on the National Register of Historic Places in Delaware
Italianate architecture in Delaware
Gothic Revival architecture in Delaware
Houses completed in 1868
Houses in Kent County, Delaware
National Register of Historic Places in Kent County, Delaware